1990–1993 is the discography compilation consisting of the entire recorded output of American powerviolence band Crossed Out, which was released in 1999 through Slap-a-Ham Records on compact disc and vinyl formats. The compilation includes previously released EP material as well as rare demos and live recordings. A limited edition of white-colored LP copies were released through direct mail order.

Background
Crossed Out was formed in late 1990 by guitarist Scot Golia, drummer Tad Miller, bassist Rich Hart, and vocalist Dallas Van Kempen. The group issued a demo tape, a self-titled 7-inch, a split 7-inch with Man Is the Bastard, and a split 5-inch with Dropdead. The group also contributed two tracks to the Slap-a-Ham compilation 7-inch Son of Blleeaauurrggh, which also featured other prominent powerviolence and grindcore acts. The group would eventually break-up in 1993 after playing only 16 live shows total in the southern California area. The last five shows featured Eric Wood (from Man Is the Bastard) on the bass, for their original bassist Hart left the group by that point. One of these last few shows, which was recorded on August 21, 1993, at the Ché Café, is featured as the last four tracks on the 1990–1993 compilation.

Track list

Personnel
Rich Hart - bass (tracks 1–43)
Eric Wood - bass (tracks 44–47)
Tad Miller - drums
Scot Golia - guitar
Dallas Van Kempen - vocals
Alan Vangundy - recording (tracks 1–7)

References

1999 compilation albums
Crossed Out albums